Tatoli, formerly known as Timor-Leste News Agency ( (ANTIL)), is the official state run news agency of East Timor.  It was launched on 27 July 2016. The word "Tatoli" is Tetum in origin, and means "to entrust someone (something/a message) to be passed on; passing on (something/a message) for someone".

In 2012, it was announced that Portuguese news agency Lusa would carry out a feasibility study into the creation of an East Timorese news agency. In 2013, Lusa presented a proposal for a suitable Portuguese-Timorese operating partnership. The establishment of an East Timorese news agency was flagged in the Government Program in March 2015, and approved by the Council of Ministers on 3 February 2016.

When the agency was launched, the then Secretary of State for Social Communication, said that its main objective is not to compete with other media representatives, but to complement information based on data and facts, and therefore to be a reference to media bodies and professionals. In 2017, it became a public institute, and changed its name to Tatoli.

The agency offers its news service in three languages – Portuguese, English and Tetum, the national language of Timor – and also text, photo and video streaming services, including by interface for viewing on mobile platforms.

References

External links
  – official site  

Government-owned companies of East Timor
News agencies based in East Timor
Tetum language
2016 establishments in East Timor